Peptostreptococcus anaerobius is a species of bacteria belonging to the Peptostreptococcus genus of anaerobic, Gram-positive, non-spore forming bacteria. The cells are small, spherical, and can occur in short chains, in pairs or individually. Peptostreptococcus are slow-growing bacteria sometimes resistance to antimicrobial drugs. P. anaerobius is intrinsically resistant to sodium polyethanol sulfonate (SPS), a component found  in many types of blood culture media. 

Peptostreptococcus anaerobius is present as part of the microbiota of the lower reproductive tract of women and has been recovered from women with pelvic inflammatory disease and bacterial vaginosis.

See also
 List of bacterial vaginosis microbiota

References

External links 

 Type strain of Peptostreptococcus anaerobius at BacDive -  the Bacterial Diversity Metadatabase

Pathogenic bacteria
Peptostreptococcaceae
Bacterial diseases
Bacterial vaginosis
Bacteria described in 1905